Arthur Hiller (3 October 1881 – 14 August 1941) was a German footballer who played club football for 1. FC Pforzheim, as well as at international level for Germany, where he became the national side's first captain. His nephew, Marius Hiller, also played football, representing both Germany and Argentina at international level.

References

1881 births
1941 deaths
German footballers
Germany international footballers
Association football midfielders
Sportspeople from Pforzheim
Footballers from Baden-Württemberg
20th-century German people